René Emilio Ponce Torres (27 April 1947 – 2 May 2011) was a senior military officer in the Salvadoran Army during the nation's civil war, and minister of defense from 1990 to 1993. He was a member of La Tandona, the class of 1966 at the Captain General Gerardo Barrios Military School. As head of the army's joint chiefs of staff he was linked, according to a report published by a Truth Commission, to the 1989 murders of Jesuits in El Salvador,  although no judicial authority has rendered a decision finding him guilty. It is worth to note that the 1992 Peace Accords, which ended the armed conflict, explicitly deprived, the Truth Commission's Report, of any value as trial evidence. Ponce died on 2 May 2011 at a military hospital in San Salvador, due to complications arising from a ruptured abdominal aortic aneurysm. Ponce's signature can be seen at the end of the document containing the 1992 Peace Accords, which ended El Salvador's civil war.

References

1947 births
2011 deaths
People from Sensuntepeque
Salvadoran military personnel
People of the Salvadoran Civil War
Government ministers of El Salvador
Defence ministers of El Salvador
Captain General Gerardo Barrios Military School alumni